Slifka is a surname. Notable people with the surname include:

 Alan B. Slifka (1929–2011), American investor and philanthropist
 Alfred Slifka, associated with Global Partners
 Noah Slifka, band member of In Fear and Faith
 Scott Slifka (born 1974), American politician

See also
 Slivka